Zhang Yueran (pinyin: Zhāng Yuèrán; born 6 November 1982) is a Chinese writer.

Biography
Zhang was born in 1982 in Jinan, Shandong. She is an only child. Her father was a professor of Shandong University, and he was very keen on literature.

Zhang is an alumnus of Shandong Experimental High School, Shandong University and National University of Singapore.

 Her main works include short stories and novels. She won the 2001 New Concept Writing Competition organised by Mengya magazine. She is often labeled as part of a group of successful Chinese authors known as the "post-'80s" generation.

In 2011 she participated in the International Writing Program Fall Residency at the University of Iowa in Iowa City.

Currently, Zhang is a teacher of Literary Studies in Renmin University of China. Several of her works have been translated into English by Jeremy Tiang, as well as into various other languages.

Works in English
 Ten Loves (2004)
 The Promise Bird (2006)
 Cocoon (2022)

Works in Chinese (Partial)
 《葵花走失在1890》 (Sunflowers Got Lost in 1890)
 《樱桃之远》 (Cherry Story)
 《是你来检阅我的忧伤了吗》 (You Come to My Sorrow)
 《十爱》 (Ten Love Stories)
 《水仙已乘鲤鱼去》 (Narcissus)
 《誓鸟》 (Birds of Swear)
 《鲤系列》 (Carp Series)
 《昼若夜房间》 (A Room of Day and Night)
 《繭》 (Cocoon)

References

1982 births
Living people
Chinese women short story writers
Chinese women novelists
20th-century Chinese short story writers
21st-century Chinese short story writers
Writers from Jinan
20th-century Chinese women writers
21st-century Chinese women writers
International Writing Program alumni
Academic staff of Renmin University of China
Shandong University alumni
National University of Singapore alumni
People's Republic of China novelists
Educators from Shandong
People's Republic of China short story writers
Short story writers from Shandong